Monte Belo do Sul is a municipality in the state of Rio Grande do Sul, Brazil, in the Serra Gaúcha.  As of 2020, the estimated population was 2,530, and the area of the municipality was 69.726 km².

See also
List of municipalities in Rio Grande do Sul

References

Municipalities in Rio Grande do Sul